Patton Bridge is a bridge located in Auburn, Washington listed on the National Register of Historic Places.
The bridge spans the Green River near metropolitan Auburn, Washington. It was designed by bridge engineer and designer Homer M. Hadley. The combination of concrete and steel box girders employed in the bridge's represents a variation of the box girder bridge style. The Patton Bridge was the only structure built between 1941 and 1950, which exhibits this innovative modification of the box girder design.

Description
Built in 1950, the Patton Bridge spans the Green River near the city of Auburn in King County, Washington. The bridge is a three-span cantilever with two anchor arms, two cantilever arms and a suspended section. It includes a combination of concrete and steel box girders. The bridge was designed by Homer M. Hadley, a consulting engineer from Washington State.
The anchor arms and cantilever arms are multiple box, two-cell reinforced concrete box girders. The suspended section consists of two spread, welded steel box girders with reinforced concrete deck. The concrete deck is fixed to the top flange plate of the girders with steel shear developers. Utilization of this deck design allows the concrete deck and steel box girders to act in composite design; i.e., the bottom flange of the steel box resists tensile forces while the concrete deck resists compressive forces.

Bibliography
King County Department of Public Works. Patton Bridge plans, dated 29 August 1949, on file in the Department of Public Works, Seattle, Washington.
King County Department of Public Works. "Bridge Condition Card—Patton Bridge" on file in the Department of Public Works, Seattle, Washington.
Soderberg, Lisa. 1980. "Historic Bridges and Tunnels in Washington State," on file in the Washington State Office of Archaeology and Historic Preservation, Olympia, Washington.

See also
 National Register of Historic Places listings in King County, Washington

References

1950 establishments in Washington (state)
Bridges completed in 1950
Buildings and structures in Auburn, Washington
Concrete bridges in the United States
National Register of Historic Places in King County, Washington
Road bridges on the National Register of Historic Places in Washington (state)
Steel bridges in the United States
Box girder bridges in the United States
Cantilever bridges in the United States
Bridges in King County, Washington